Forward Gal (foaled 1968 in Florida) was an American Thoroughbred Champion racehorse. Out of the mare, Forward Thrust, she was sired by Florida Derby winner Native Charger who also sired 1970 Belmont Stakes winner High Echelon.

Bred by Abraham Savin and raced under the colors of his  Aisco Stable, Forward Gal was trained by future U.S. Racing Hall of Fame inductee, Warren Croll. In 1970 Forward Gal's performances earned her American Champion Two-Year-Old Filly honors and although she did not repeat as champion at age three, she was one of the top fillies  in her age group and under jockey Michael Hole won several important races including the 1971 Gazelle Handicap and Comely Stakes.

Retired to broodmare duty, Forward Gal was bred to sires such as Northern Dancer and Secretariat. Of her five foals, none succeeded in racing. Forward Gal died in 1984.

References

 Forward Gal's pedigree and partial racing stats
 August 27, 1970 New York Times article on Forward Gal's win in the Spinaway Stakes

1968 racehorse births
1984 racehorse deaths
Racehorses bred in Florida
Racehorses trained in the United States
American Champion racehorses
Thoroughbred family 9-e